The BAE Systems Fast Interceptor Craft is a stealthy boat used by the Special Boat Service. The builder offers it in several configurations, the 33, 40 and 180 versions. There are a variety of propulsion types available, including both inboard and outboard engines with surface drives or water jets.
The boats are air portable in Hercules, C-17 and A400M aircraft.

References

Military boats
Special forces of the United Kingdom
Royal Marines
Special forces
Amphibious warfare vessels of the United Kingdom